Star is a Canadian short drama film, directed by Émilie Mannering and released in 2015. The film stars Kevin Geronimo Tejeda and Justin Joselin Geronimo Morris as Tito and Jay, two young Black Canadian brothers living in the Montreal neighbourhood of Parc-Extension.

The film was a shortlisted Quebec Cinema Award nominee for Best Short Film at the 18th Quebec Cinema Awards. At the 5th Canadian Screen Awards, the film was shortlisted for Best Live Action Short Drama.

References

External links 
 

2015 short films
2015 drama films
2015 films
Quebec films
Black Canadian films
French-language Canadian films
Canadian drama short films
2010s Canadian films